KOS may refer to:

 Knowledge of Self, a precept of the Five-Percent Nation
 Knowledge Organization Systems
 KOS Media, Kent, England
 KOS (Yugoslavia), counterintelligence service
 KOS (Serbia)
 Kosovo (UNDP code: KOS), a partially recognized state in Southeastern Europe

See also
 Kos (disambiguation)
 k-os